Crematogaster clydia is a species of ant in tribe Crematogastrini. It was described by Forel in 1912.

References

clydia
Insects described in 1912